Commotria phoenicias is a species of snout moth in the genus Commotria. It was described by George Hampson, in 1918, and is known from Nigeria and Uganda.

References

Moths described in 1918
Anerastiini